The Church of the Exaltation of the Holy Cross is a cathedral in Bratislava, Slovakia. It was built in the year 1860 at the edge of St. Andrew's cemetery (Ondrejský cintorín). Since 1972, the church belongs to Greek Catholic Church. It is the cathedral church of the Eparchy of Bratislava since 2008.

History 
The founding stone was laid on May 13, 1859. The church was consecrated by Archbishop of Esztergom, cardinal János Scitovszky on September 14, 1860.

Today, liturgy is both in Slovak and Old Church Slavonic.

See also 
 List of cathedrals in Slovakia
 Greek Catholic Church
 Slovak Greek Catholic Church
 Old Town, Bratislava

References

External links 
 Information about the Cathedral 
 Parish homepage (english)
 3D panoramas of the Church

Eastern Catholic cathedrals in Slovakia
Churches in Bratislava
Slovak Greek Catholic Church
Slovak Greek Catholic cathedrals
19th-century Roman Catholic church buildings in Slovakia